OVO Energy is a major energy supplier based in Bristol, England.

It was founded by Stephen Fitzpatrick and began trading energy in September 2009, buying and selling electricity and gas to supply domestic properties throughout the UK. By June 2017 OVO had 680,000 customers, an increase of 10,000 over the previous year, representing a 2.5% domestic market share. In November 2018, OVO Energy acquired one of its largest competitors, Spark Energy.  Although at first one of over 15 smaller energy companies competing with the Big Six which dominated the market, in January 2020 OVO completed the acquisition of the retail arm of SSE, becoming itself one of the Big Six and the country's third-largest domestic energy supply company.

History 
OVO Energy is British-owned and privately backed, with its headquarters in Bristol.  OVO Energy supplies gas and electricity to domestic customers since 2009, and to business customers since 2013. This sector of the UK economy is dominated by a number of larger companies known as the Big Six.

On 14 February 2019, Mitsubishi Corporation bought a 20 percent stake in OVO, valuing the company at £1bn.

OVO Energy is part of OVO Group, which in turn is a subsidiary of Imagination Industries Ltd, a holding company wholly owned by Stephen Fitzpatrick.

In 2022, OVO Energy was ranked second worst (only behind Utilita) in customer service by Citizens Advice.

Acquisitions 
The 2018 acquisition of Spark Energy included a subsidiary, Home Telecom Limited, which specialises in providing telephone and broadband services to tenants of private landlords.

In September 2019, OVO agreed to pay £500 million for SSE Energy Services, the retail business of SSE plc, and the purchase – which included SSE's 8,000 employees and their phone, broadband and heating insurance customers – was completed in January 2020. This made OVO the UK's second-largest energy supply company (after British Gas) with around 5 million customers. OVO stated that the SSE brand would continue for the time being. SSE had earlier intended to merge the business with Innogy's subsidiary Npower, but this was called off in December 2018. Following OVO Energy's takeover of SSE, numerous reports of incorrect and inflated bills were reported by former SSE consumers who had their accounts transferred to OVO Energy.

Regulator action 
OVO Energy has been fined across two consecutive years, from 2020 to 2021, for their predatory practices.

In January 2020, OVO Energy agreed to pay £8.9m into Ofgem's voluntary redress fund, after an investigation by Ofgem found instances of undercharging and overcharging, and inaccurate annual statements sent to more than half a million customers between 2015 and 2018. Head of Ofgem enforcement, Anthony Pygram, said "The supplier did not prioritise putting these issues right whilst its business was expanding."

In March 2021, as part of a wider investigation into price protection failings by energy suppliers, OVO's practices were found to have caused detriment to 240,563 customers totalling over £2m, and the company was required to pay redress of over £2.8m – the highest amount of compensation among the 18 companies investigated.

Despite such regulator action, OVO energy's practice of overcharging consumers remains a common recurring theme within news reports.

Electricity 
Electricity supplied by OVO Energy comes from various sources including wind farms in Gloucestershire and North Wales, and the burning of landfill gas. Its two tariffs include 50% green electricity (OVO Better Energy) and 100% green electricity (OVO Greener Energy).

OVO's "pay as you go" product has been branded as Boost since 2017. After taking on customers from Economy Energy in 2019, the brand had around 350,000 customers.

Gas 
OVO Energy sources its gas from the national grid. The majority of the UK's gas is sourced from the North Sea; the rest comes from Norway, Continental Europe and some from further afield.

Energy market competition 
The entry of OVO into the UK supply market in 2009 was welcomed as it increased competition in a market that had been criticised for high prices.

In October 2013, Managing Director Stephen Fitzpatrick appeared at the Energy and Climate Change Select Committee, when energy companies were asked to justify recent gas and electricity price rises. Fitzpatrick explained to the committee that the 'wholesale gas price had actually got cheaper', contrary to the Big Six energy suppliers' assertions that international global prices of gas and electricity had consistently risen.

In November 2018, OVO acquired one of its rivals, Spark Energy, after the troubled supplier ceased trading.

Following the collapse of Economy Energy in January 2019, regulator Ofgem announced that OVO Energy would take on Economy Energy's 235,000 customers.

Sponsorship 
In 2016, OVO sponsored the Bristol leg of the Tour of Britain cycling race. In 2017, the company began sponsoring both The Women's Tour and the Tour of Britain, the longest cycle stage races taking place in the UK. In March 2018, OVO announced they would begin providing equal prize money for both tours.
They are no longer sponsoring either race .

In October 2021, OVO Energy took over sponsorship of Glasgow's entertainment and multi-purpose indoor arena, which was rebranded as the OVO Hydro.

Management 
Stacey Cartwright was appointed as chair of the board at OVO Energy in April 2020. She holds other directorships including at Savills, Genpact and the Football Association, and was deputy chair at retailer Harvey Nichols. Non-executive directors include Jonson Cox, chair of water regulator Ofwat.

References

External links 
 

Electric power companies of the United Kingdom
Utilities of the United Kingdom
Companies based in Bristol